The Ringer is a sports and pop culture website and podcast network, founded by sportswriter Bill Simmons in 2016 and owned by Spotify since 2020.

History 
The Ringer was launched in March 2016 by Bill Simmons, who brought along several editors who had previously worked with him on Grantland, an ESPN-owned blog he operated from 2011 to 2015. At launch, the Ringer had a staff of 43 and focused primarily on sports and pop culture as content areas, with a few writers also working on technology and politics. HBO, the network on which Simmons hosted his weekly television program Any Given Wednesday one season in 2016, was an initial investor in the website.

The website was previously published on the Medium platform. In May 2017, The Ringer entered into an advertising and technology partnership with Vox Media (owner of SB Nation), under which Vox would handle advertising sales, and give the site access to its in-house publishing platform.

Former Grantland writers who have since written for or worked for The Ringer include Mark Titus, Shea Serrano, Ben Lindbergh, Robert Mays, Sean Fennessey, Chris Ryan, Mallory Rubin, Juliet Litman, Craig Gaines, Bryan Curtis, David Shoemaker, Ryan O'Hanlon, Danny Chau, Jason Concepcion, Riley McAtee, Joe Fuentes, and Tate Frazier.

In May 2018, The Ringer published a story by Ben Detrick about Bryan Colangelo, then the GM of the Philadelphia 76ers, and his apparent use of various Twitter accounts to criticize players and defend himself. This led to Colangelo's resignation on June 7, 2018.

In August 2019, The Ringers editorial staff voted to unionize with the Writers Guild of America, East. The union was voluntarily recognized by the Ringer's management four days later.

On February 5, 2020, subscription music streaming service Spotify announced it was acquiring The Ringer for an estimated $195 million and an additional $50 million in performance-driven incentives. Spotify chief content officer Dawn Ostroff stated that Simmons was "one of the brightest minds in the game and he has successfully innovated as a writer and content creator across mediums and platforms."

Content 
Like the content on the website, the Ringer's podcast network covers both sports and pop culture. The flagship podcast, The Bill Simmons Podcast, is an interview show hosted by Simmons, featuring other Ringer writers and podcast hosts as well as athletes, filmmakers, comedians, and pop culture figures. Popular podcast hosts include former Daily Show correspondent Larry Wilmore (host of Black on the Air) and James Beard Award-winning chef David Chang (The Dave Chang Show). 

Former podcasts include Keepin' it 1600, a politics podcast featuring former Obama speechwriters Jon Favreau, Dan Pfeiffer, and others. After leaving the Ringer, the hosts of Keepin' it 1600 created a new podcast called Pod Save America as part of their own new media company, Crooked Media.

In 2017, The Ringer began the video podcast series Talk the Thrones, an aftershow for Game of Thrones hosted by Ringer staff writers and live-streamed on Twitter. Talk the Thrones is a continuation of After the Thrones, which aired on HBO.

The Ringer premiered Binge Mode in 2017, a podcast that has recapped every episode of Game of Thrones and every book in the Harry Potter series.

As of April 30, 2018, The Ringer's world-wide Alexa ranking is 2,077 with over 15 million views per month. Of those, 6,150,000 are unique visitors.

Podcasts
The list of podcasts offered as of August 2021. The Ringer podcast network features a slate of more than 30 podcasts. Since being acquired by Spotify in February 2020, The Ringer has continued to publish its podcasts across platforms while promoting additional shows that are exclusive to Spotify.

References

External links
 

American blogs
Sports blogs
Internet properties established in 2016
Podcasting companies
Spotify
2020 mergers and acquisitions
American entertainment news websites
American review websites
Television websites
Entertainment websites
American sport websites